Mario Lara (born 8 April 1966) is a Spanish former racing cyclist. He rode in the 1990 Tour de France.

References

External links
 

1966 births
Living people
Spanish male cyclists
People from Ronda
Sportspeople from the Province of Málaga
Cyclists from Andalusia